In mathematics, a representation theorem is a theorem that states that every abstract structure with certain properties is isomorphic to another (abstract or concrete) structure.

Examples

Algebra 

 Cayley's theorem states that every group is isomorphic to a permutation group.
 Representation theory studies properties of abstract groups via their representations as linear transformations of vector spaces.
Stone's representation theorem for Boolean algebras states that every Boolean algebra is isomorphic to a field of sets. 
 A variant, Stone's representation theorem for distributive lattices, states that every distributive lattice is isomorphic to a sublattice of the power set lattice of some set.
 Another variant, Stone's duality, states that there exists a duality (in the sense of an arrow-reversing equivalence) between the categories of Boolean algebras and that of Stone spaces.
 The Poincaré–Birkhoff–Witt theorem states that every Lie algebra embeds into the commutator Lie algebra of its universal enveloping algebra.
Ado's theorem states that every finite-dimensional Lie algebra over a field of characteristic zero embeds into the Lie algebra of endomorphisms of some finite-dimensional vector space.
Birkhoff's HSP theorem states that every model of an algebra A is the homomorphic image of a subalgebra of a direct product of copies of A.
 In the study of semigroups, the Wagner–Preston theorem provides a representation of an inverse semigroup S, as a homomorphic image of the set of partial bijections on S, and the semigroup operation given by composition.

Category theory 

 The Yoneda lemma provides a full and faithful limit-preserving embedding of any category into a category of presheaves.
Mitchell's embedding theorem for abelian categories realises every small abelian category as a full (and exactly embedded) subcategory of a category of modules over some ring.
Mostowski's collapsing theorem states that every well-founded extensional structure is isomorphic to a transitive set with the ∈-relation.
 One of the fundamental theorems in sheaf theory states that every sheaf over a topological space can be thought of as a sheaf of sections of some (étalé) bundle over that space: the categories of sheaves on a topological space and that of étalé spaces over it are equivalent, where the equivalence is given by the functor that sends a bundle to its sheaf of (local) sections.

Functional analysis 

 The Gelfand–Naimark–Segal construction embeds any C*-algebra in an algebra of bounded operators on some Hilbert space.
 The Gelfand representation (also known as the commutative Gelfand–Naimark theorem) states that any commutative C*-algebra is isomorphic to an algebra of continuous functions on its Gelfand spectrum. It can also be seen as the construction as a duality between the category of commutative C*-algebras and that of compact Hausdorff spaces.
 The Riesz–Markov–Kakutani representation theorem is actually a list of several theorems; one of them identifies the dual space of C0(X) with the set of regular measures on X.

Geometry 

 The Whitney embedding theorems embed any abstract manifold in some Euclidean space.
 The Nash embedding theorem embeds an abstract Riemannian manifold isometrically in a Euclidean space.

Economics 
 A preference representation theorem states conditions for the existence of a utility function representing a preference relation. Examples are Von Neumann–Morgenstern utility theorem and Debreu's representation theorems.

See also 

 Classification theorem

References 

Mathematical theorems